Sanjiang Dong Autonomous County is under the administration of Liuzhou, Guangxi Zhuang Autonomous Region, China. It is a region traditionally inhabited by the Dong people, bordering the prefecture-level divisions of Qiandongnan (Guizhou) to the north, Huaihua (Hunan) to the northeast and Guilin to the west.

Transportation
China National Highway 209
Reach by bus from Longsheng Rice Terrace about 1.5 hours, Guilin 4.5 hours
The station mainly serves the Guiyang-Guangzhou high-speed railway that pass through the area.

Tourism

 north of Sanjiang, toward Hunan province, lies the area of Dong people, Chengyang (程阳), which is a popular destination for backpacker tourism. The area comprises eight traditional Dong minority villages. The houses are all made of wood. Inside the villages you will find traditional drum towers, which were used to announce important things or simply to perform plays to entertain the villagers. Crossing the river is the best preserved Wind and Rain Bridge (程阳风雨桥, chéng yáng fēng yǔ qiáo) which has five parts. The bridge dates to 1912 and is for many people the main reason to visit the village.

North of Chengyang lies the tiny village of Linxia which is interesting because of the local market, but there are no places to stay in Linxia.

Climate

Notable people
Wu Hongfei, journalist, novelist, and rock singer

See also
 Rong River
 Rongshui Miao Autonomous County

References

External links

Official website of Sanjiang County Government

County-level divisions of Guangxi
Liuzhou
Kam autonomous counties